Simple Skincare is a British brand of soap and skincare products designed for sensitive skin. Simple has been owned by Unilever since 2010.

History
The brand was developed in 1960 by the Albion Group. In the late 1980s the business was acquired by Smith and Nephew. In June 2000, Smith and Nephew divested its consumer products division; a management buyout, led by CEO Geoff Percy and Finance Director Peter Hatherly, for £140m resulted in the formation of Accantia, owner of the Simple brand.

In January 2004, a secondary buyout was completed. Following an unsolicited approach, the board of Accantia sold the company to Duke Street Capital for £225m. Accantia's existing senior management team remained in place.

In April 2009, Accantia changed its name to Simple Health & Beauty Group Limited. Simple Health & Beauty Group Limited was bought by the US company Alberto-Culver for £240 million in December 2009. Alberto-Culver was bought by the Anglo–Dutch multinational consumer goods company Unilever in September 2010, and Simple was formally taken over around six months later.

Advertising 
In 1986, the company asked its advertising agency Deighton & Mullen to produce a TV commercial. Entitled 'Gilding the Lily', this ran on the newly launched Channel 4 and featured a  pristine white lily being sprayed by robotic arms with colouring and perfume. It was created by Colin Underhay (art director) and Alex Pearl (copywriter) and directed by Len Fulford, while Lord David Dundas wrote the piano score in the style of Erik Satie, and Joanna Lumley provided the voice over.

References

External links
 
 

British brands
Soap brands
Personal care brands
Companies based in the West Midlands (county)
Unilever brands
Products introduced in 1960